TAP Movies is a Philippine pay television channel dedicated to Hollywood films owned by TAP Digital Media Ventures Corporation. It was launched on October 1, 2021.

Programming
Much like other English-language movie channels, TAP Movies mainly carries films from major Hollywood film studios Universal Pictures, Paramount Pictures, Regency Enterprises, StudioCanal, Millennium Media, Metro-Goldwyn-Mayer, and Lionsgate Films.

In addition to movies, the channel also airs TV miniseries and live theatrical musicals.

TAP Action Flix

TAP Action Flix is the secondary movie channel of TAP DMV. It features Hollywood films related to horror, suspense, thriller and action genres.

See also
 TAP TV
 TAP Edge
 TAP Sports
 Premier Sports

References

English-language television stations in the Philippines
Television channels and stations established in 2021
2021 establishments in the Philippines
TAP Digital Media Ventures Corporation